Kyle Helton (born May 20, 1986 in Birmingham, Alabama) is an American former soccer player who last played for Mjøndalen.

Career

Youth and Amateur
Helton grew up in Birmingham, Alabama before moving to Alpharetta, Georgia, attended Milton High School, and played college soccer at Duke University where he earned a degree in economics and public policy at age 21. He was named to the Parade Magazine All-America team in 2003, was selected to play in the McDonald’s All-America High School game, was part of the ACC All-Freshman Team in 2003, and was named to the Second Team All-ACC in 2006. He also played club soccer with the Atlanta Fire, leading the team to the national championship in 2002, third place at the nationals in 2001 and two regional championships.

During his college years Helton also played with Augusta Fireball in the USL Premier Development League.

Professional
Helton was drafted in the fourth round (51st overall) of the 2007 MLS SuperDraft by New England Revolution

Helton made his professional debut on July 10, 2007, in the third round of a US Open Cup game against the Rochester Rhinos, entering the game in the 84th minute. He also played extensively in the MLS Reserve Division until the end of 2008.

Helton signed with Austin Aztex U23 of the USL Premier Development League for the 2009 season. After making three starts for the U23 team, Helton was promoted up to the Austin Aztex senior team in May 2009, and made his debut for the team on May 17, 2009, in a game against Montreal Impact. In Spring 2011 signed for Norwegian club Mjøndalen IF.

International
Helton joined the United States Under-17 National Team as a sophomore and played in more than 60 matches with the U.S. Youth National team in 2002-2003. He was part of the United States squad at the 2003 FIFA U-17 World Championship in Lahti, Finland.

Honors

New England Revolution
Lamar Hunt U.S. Open Cup (1): 2007

References

External links
 MLS player profile
 Duke University bio

Living people
1986 births
American soccer players
Duke Blue Devils men's soccer players
Augusta FireBall players
New England Revolution players
Austin Aztex U23 players
Austin Aztex FC players
Mjøndalen IF players
Parade High School All-Americans (boys' soccer)
Soccer players from Birmingham, Alabama
USL First Division players
USL League Two players
United States men's youth international soccer players
New England Revolution draft picks
Association football defenders